Nelson Davis may refer to:

 Nelson Charles Davis, the spouse of Harriet Tubman
 Nelson H. Davis (1821–1888), American soldier
 Nelson M. Davis, former chairman of the Argus Corporation
 Nelson Davis, character in Killshot (film)

See also
 Nelson Davis Porter (1863–1961), mayor of Ottawa, Canada, 1915–1916